"Don't Fence Me In" is a popular American song written in 1934, with music by Cole Porter and lyrics by Robert Fletcher and Cole Porter. Members of the Western Writers of America chose it as one of the Top 100 Western songs of all time.

Origins
Originally written in 1934 for Adios, Argentina, an unproduced 20th Century Fox film musical, "Don't Fence Me In" was based on text by Robert (Bob) Fletcher, a poet and engineer with the Department of Highways in Helena, Montana. Cole Porter, who had been asked to write a cowboy song for the 20th Century Fox musical, bought the poem from Fletcher for $250. Porter reworked Fletcher's poem, and when the song was first published, Porter was credited with sole authorship. Porter had wanted to give Fletcher co-authorship credit, but his publishers did not allow it. The original copyright publication notice dated October 10, 1944 and the copyright card dated and filed on October 12, 1944 in the U.S. Copyright Office solely lists words and music by Cole Porter. After the song became popular, however, Fletcher hired attorneys who negotiated his co-authorship credit in subsequent publications. Although it was one of the most popular songs of its time, Porter claimed it was his least favorite of his compositions.

Porter's revision of the song retained quite a few portions of Fletcher's lyrics, such as  “Give me land, lots of land”, “... breeze ... cottonwood trees”, “turn me loose, let me straddle my old saddle,” “mountains rise ... western skies”, “cayuse”, “where the west commences,” and “... hobbles ... can’t stand fences,” but in some places modified them to give them “the smart Porter touch”. Porter replaced some lines, rearranged lyric phrases, and added two verses. (Porter's verses about Wildcat Kelly are not included in any of the hit recordings of the song but are used in the Roy Rogers film of the same title. Roy Rogers sings the first verse with the lyric "Wildcat Willy" when he performed it in 1944's Hollywood Canteen. Both verses are included in the Ella Fitzgerald  and Harry Connick Jr. versions of the song.).

Roy Rogers and "Don't Fence Me In"
Roy Rogers sang it in the 1944 Warner Bros. movie Hollywood Canteen. Many people heard the song for the first time when Kate Smith introduced it on her radio broadcast of October 8, 1944.

In 1945, the song was sung again as the title tune of another Roy Rogers film, Don't Fence Me In (1945), in which Dale Evans plays a magazine reporter who comes to Roy Rogers' and Gabby Whittaker's (George "Gabby" Hayes) ranch to research her story about a legendary late gunslinger.  When it's revealed that Whittaker is actually the supposedly dead outlaw, Rogers must clear his name. Rogers and The Sons of the Pioneers perform songs, including the Cole Porter title tune.

The next year (1946), the Cole Porter biopic Night and Day used a clip from Hollywood Canteen of Rogers singing "Don't Fence Me In."

Bing Crosby version
Bing Crosby and The Andrews Sisters with Vic Schoen and his Orchestra recorded it in 1944, without having seen or heard the song. Crosby entered the studio on July 25, 1944. Within 30 minutes, he and the Andrews Sisters had completed the recording, which sold more than a million copies and topped the Billboard charts for eight weeks in 1944–45.  This version also went to number nine on the Harlem Hit Parade chart.

Frank Sinatra version
Frank Sinatra appeared on the Your Hit Parade program on December 23, 1944 and performed this song, which at the time was the #1 song in the country. The arrangement, written by both Lowell Martin (the first section of the arrangement) and Billy May (the second part including the shout chorus) was conducted by Axel Stordahl and the Lucky Strike Orchestra. Stordahl counted off the arrangement a little too fast and Sinatra could not keep up with the fast pace of the lyrics. As a result, he stumbled on the words "underneath the western skies."  Then, after the phrase "I want to ride to the ridge where the West commences" he utters "too many words," most likely in an effort to explain his on-air slip-up. Shortly after his performance Sinatra was fired from the show supposedly due to his on-air comment about the lyrics.

Other versions
 Labrinth sang it in a 2019 Super Bowl commercial for Mini.
 John Barrowman sang it in his album "Swings Cole Porter"
 Kate Smith also had a top ten hit with it in 1945.
 Ella Fitzgerald recorded the song on her Verve Records album Ella Fitzgerald Sings the Cole Porter Songbook (1956). It was also released on Ella Fitzgerald Sings More Cole Porter.
 Michael Wyckoff, Kalya Ramu and Nathan Ford remixed it for the 2022 VR Game Bonelab, developed and published by Stress Level Zero.
 Hoyt Axton on his 1982 LP Pistol Packin' Mama
 Frankie Laine did a cover of this song on his 1982 album The World of Frankie Laine.
 Ana Belén (Spanish singer): In her 1983 album Veneno para el corazón sings a version called 'Déjame ir
 David Byrne recorded a version for the 1990 Cole Porter tribute album entitled Red Hot + Blue. Byrne performed what he describes as his "Brazilian" version of the song during his 2004 tour for the Grown Backwards album.
 Mary McCaslin recorded the complete song including the introductory verse that is often omitted on the 1977 album "Old Friends"
 Little Willie Littlefield recorded a version for his 1990 album Singalong with Little Willie Littlefield.
 Lynn Anderson recorded the song for her 1992 album Cowboy's Sweetheart in 1992.
 Chumbawamba recorded in 1992 a version of the song with lead vocals by Danbert Nobacon. A segment of the song featured on the unreleased album Jesus H. Christ that was later reworked to become Shhh! (1992), but "Don't Fence Me In" did not feature on the final album cut.
 Lari White recorded a version for her 1996 album Don't Fence Me In.
 Harry Connick Jr. did a version of the song on his 2001 album 30 which includes Porter's opening verse about Wildcat Kelly.
 The Killers recorded the track to be used in support of the 2013 Nevada state tourism campaign, called "A World Within. A State Apart."
 Paul Kelly & Charlie Owen recorded it for their 2016 album Death's Dateless Night.
 The Okee Dokee Brothers recorded a cover for their 2016 album Saddle Up.
 Eddy Arnold, who included it on his release A Dozen Hits
 Gene Autry
 Ray Benson from Asleep At The Wheel
 Steve Goodman performed the song, included on his album The Easter Tapes, recorded during one of his annual visits with New York radio personality Vin Scelsa. Goodman changed the lyrics in two places from "Let me straddle my old saddle underneath the Western skies" to "Let me straddle my old cattle underneath the Western skies." He remarks when the song is done, "Straddling cattle? Good, they're only words."
 Willie Nelson recorded a version of the song with Leon Russell.
 The Australian male voice choir The Spooky Men's Chorale has recorded the song on their DVD album Deep.
 The Mitch Miller Chorus sang it in the album "Sing Along With Mitch Miller & The Gang".
 Clint Eastwood sang it in the album "Rawhide's Clint Eastwood Sings Cowboy Favorites".
 James Brown recorded a version for his 1974 album Reality.

In popular culture
 1950: A parody of the song was sung in the 1950 musical film Nancy Goes to Rio by Carmen Miranda. The parodic song, titled "Yipsee-I-O", was written by Ray Gilbert.
 1952: The song is an instrumental theme in the film Return of the Texan starring Dale Robertson and Walter Brennan.
 1954: The song was sung in the 1954 action movie Hell and High Water.
 1961: Shortly after the Berlin Wall was erected in 1961, a Communist-run East Berlin radio station called Ops used “Don’t Fence Me In” as the theme song for its nightly broadcast aimed at Allied soldiers, based in West Berlin.
 1974: Used in the World  documentary The World at War in an episode covering the American entry into war.
 1977: Bob Hope did a cover of this song on The Muppet Show.
 1980s: Bing Crosby's version was used in an advertisement for Centre Parcs UK, directed by Sharon Maguire. The advert was re-broadcast on ITV during the late 1990s. 
 1980: The Bing Crosby version is listened to by a character in the novel Clear Light of Day by Anita Desai and this angers another character.
 1993: Cary-Hiroyuki Tagawa's character, Eddie Sakamura, sings it at a karaoke bar in the opening scene of the 1993 film, Rising Sun. It is also played while the end credits roll.
 1994: Featured in Mickey's Fun Songs: Campout at Walt Disney World, with Goofy, Mickey, Minnie, and the Fun Songs Kids performing the song on a hayride around the campsite.
 1999: The song was featured in the 1999 film The Bachelor, which follows a sworn bachelor who is reluctant to marry.
 2000: The song was used in the opening credits of the 2000 film Chopper.
 2002: The first verse of the song was sung by Apu in The Simpsons episode "The Lastest Gun in the West".
 2004: Song nominated by the American Film Institute (AFI) for inclusion in that organization's select list of "100 Years...100 Songs"
 2011: Black Iris covered the song in a popular Nokia commercial for the Nokia C7. Despite the public response, the song was never released as a full-track MP3.
 2013: Pablo Bubar reintroduced the song in one of the musical romance sketches of "Pablo the Romantic" from Boom Town, broadcast by BBC Three (UK, 2013). This version includes the piano music of Ross Leadbeater.
 2015: The song was featured in the ending of the Pretty Little Liars Season 5 episode "Welcome to the Dollhouse."
 2016: A cover with a version of the song by Pull was used in the Discover It Miles card commercial.
 2016: The song was featured in a commercial for Nevada tourism.
 2018: The Bing Crosby and the Andrews Sisters version is played on the Appalachia Radio Station in Fallout 76.
 2019: A cover was sung by Columbia (the female personification of America) in the sixth episode from the second season of American Gods, titled "Donar the Great".
 2019: The Ella Fitzgerald version is used in episode 4 of Hulu's Catch-22.
 2020: The Bing Crosby and the Andrews Sisters version is featured in episode 8 of Ratched on Netflix.
 2022: Michael Wyckoff, Nathan Ford, and Kalya Ramu recorded a synth-heavy version for the credits and teaser trailer of the virtual reality game, BONELAB.

See also
 List of number-one singles of 1944 and 1945 (U.S.)

References

1934 songs
1944 singles
Bing Crosby songs
The Andrews Sisters songs
Kate Smith songs
Roy Rogers songs
Little Willie Littlefield songs
Frankie Laine songs
Western music (North America)
Songs written by Cole Porter
Grammy Hall of Fame Award recipients
Number-one singles in the United States